Jordan Creek is a stream in Fillmore County, in the U.S. state of Minnesota.

Jordan Creek took its name from the Jordan River, in West Asia.

See also
List of rivers of Minnesota

References

Rivers of Fillmore County, Minnesota
Rivers of Minnesota